Ithile Iniyum Varu is a 1986 Indian Malayalam-language film,  directed by  P. G. Viswambharan. The film stars Mammootty, Mukesh, Dipika Chikhlia and Thilakan in lead roles. The film had musical score by Shyam. It was remake of 1984 Hindi film Mashaal.

Plot
Aravindan (Mammootty) is a bold journalist keen on exposing the illegal activities on M. S. Nair (Balan K. Nair). He is ousted from the newspaper he works for, and decides to start his own paper. With the help of Kaimal (Thilakan), he starts an evening newspaper. He also succeeds in persuading Ramu (Mukesh), a wayward youth, to give up his bad habits. He sends Ramu for further studies in Chennai.  Priya (Dipika Chikhlia) who works with Aravindan, develops a liking for Ramu.

In a bad turn of events, M. S. Nair destroys Aravindan's press, and gets him thrown out of his home. Aravindan's wife (Madhu Kapoor) is sick, and dies on the way to the hospital, when several passersby, including M. S. Nair fail to stop for assistance. This enrages Aravindan, and he proclaims that his only target now is to amass money and gain power. With the help of Kaimal, Govindankutty Ashan (Achankunju) and Rajesh (Kundara Johny), he starts a smuggling business. Soon he emerges as an underworld don.

Ramu comes back, and realizing that Aravindan is a new man, confronts Aravindan and questions his new ideals. He still likes and respects Aravindan. Rajesh is caught by M. S. Nair, and Aravindan gets to an aluminium factory where he is being held. In the resulting fight, M. S. Nair is killed by Aravindan. As the police arrives to arrest him, Aravindan says he will come back to fight injustice.

Cast
Mammootty as Aravindan
Mukesh as Ramu
Dipika Chikhlia as Priya Nair
Thilakan as Kaimal
Balan K. Nair as M. S. Nair
Kundara Johny as Rajesh
Kunchan as Lawrence
N. Govindankutty as Chief editor Menon
Kothuku Nanappan as Joseph
Innocent as Dasappan
Achankunju as Govindankutty Ashan
Santhosh as Kasim
 Madhu Kapoor as Ambika
 Nahas

References

External links
 

1986 films
1980s Malayalam-language films
Films directed by P. G. Viswambharan
Malayalam remakes of Hindi films